The Swedish Space Corporation (SSC) provides space subsystems, space and satellite operations, rocket and balloon systems including experiment equipment, launch services, aerospace engineering services as well as airborne maritime surveillance systems. Through its wholly owned subsidiaries ECAPS and NanoSpace, the SSC is also engaged in the development of propulsion systems and micromechanical systems for space applications.

From its facility Esrange Space Center in Northern Sweden, the SSC launches sounding rockets and high-altitude balloons for research in the areas of microgravity, astrophysics, astronomy and atmospheric studies. One notable program during the late 1980s/early 1990s was a joint project with the Society of Japanese Aerospace Companies using SSC's MASER rocket to lift aloft various experiments requiring microgravity environments, at a low cost. This was during a period when U.S. Space Shuttle flights along with associated planned experiments were still being disrupted by the aftermath of the Challenger disaster.

At Esrange SSC operates one of the world's busiest civilian satellite ground stations, communicating with both telecom and scientific satellites. The SSC's facility Stockholm Teleport provides satellite communication services, and the wholly owned German company LSE is specialised in satellite control and ground station services. The SSC runs a global ground station network, PrioraNet, in which its US subsidiary Universal Space Network plays a big part.

On 1 July 2011, the SSC sold its satellite division to the German space company OHB which then formed a Swedish subsidiary named OHB-Sweden.

In February 2013, a government audit was released by the Swedish National Audit Office which concluded that "Swedish space investment is distributed among multiple organizations that operate as stovepipes with no real communication between them and no common ambition."

The SSC announced on 21 September 2020 that it was not renewing its contract to help operate Chinese satellites from its ground stations, and that it would cease doing business in China altogether.

Scientific satellites developed 
 Prisma satellites – launched 15 June 2010
 SMART-1 – launched 27 September 2003
 Odin – launched 20 February 2001
 Astrid 2 – launched 10 December 1998
 Astrid 1 – launched 24 January 1995
 Freja – launched 6 October 1992
 Viking – launched 22 February 1986

Telecom satellites project management 
 Tele-X
 Sirius W
 Sirius 2
 Sirius 3

Other locations 
SSC Ground Station Network:
 Yatharagga Satellite Station – SSC Space Australia
 Esrange Satellite Station at Esrange Space Center

References

External links 
 Swedish Space Corporation – Official website
 OHB Sweden – Official website
 SSC Ground Station Network

1972 establishments in Sweden
Technology companies established in 1972
Government-owned companies of Sweden
Scientific organizations based in Sweden
Defence companies of Sweden
Aerospace companies of Sweden
Space programme of Sweden
Companies based in Solna Municipality